Shahidan bin Kassim (Jawi: شهيدان بن قاسم; born 17 June 1951) is a Malaysian politician who has served as the Member of Parliament (MP) for Arau from August 1986 to April 1995 and again since May 2013. He served as the Minister of Federal Territories in the Barisan Nasional (BN) administration under former Prime Minister Ismail Sabri Yaakob from August 2021 to the collapse of the BN administration in November 2022, President of the Kuala Lumpur City F.C. since August 2022, Chairman of the Perbadanan Perumahan Rakyat 1Malaysia (PR1MA) from March to November 2021, Minister in the Prime Minister's Department in the BN administration under former Prime Minister Najib Razak from May 2013 to May 2018, Menteri Besar of Perlis from May 1995 to March 2008 and Member of the Perlis State Legislative Assembly (MLA) for Tambun Tulang from April 1995 to May 2013. He is a member of the Malaysian Islamic Party (PAS), a component party of the Perikatan Nasional (PN) coalition and was a member of the United Malays National Organisation (UMNO), a component party of the BN coalition. He served as the Chairman of the PN Government Backbenchers Club (PNBBC) from May 2020 to the collapse of the PN government in August 2021.

Early life
Shahidan was born in Tambun Tulang on 17 June 1951. He went to Sekolah Menengah Sultan Abdul Halim (popularly known as Jenan) and served as Head of Rumah Cendikia.

Political career
Shahidan was a Member of Parliament for Arau from 1986 to 1995.

He was elected to the Perlis State Legislative Assembly for the newly created seat of Tambun Tulang in the 1995 general elections. He immediately became Chief Minister of Perlis, taking over from Hamid Pawanteh. His tenure as Chief Minister came to an end in March 2008, when Md Isa Sabu, a fellow member of Barisan Nasional, was appointed to the post by Raja Sirajuddin of Perlis after a general election in which UMNO retained its majority in the State Assembly. Md Isa claimed the support of eight out of the 12 other Barisan Nasional members of the Perlis State Assembly to replace Shahidan. While Shahidan had the nomination of the Prime Minister, Abdullah Badawi, and the state party machinery, the Raja was concerned about the stability of the state government should Shahidan, a powerful but divisive factional figure in UMNO, be reappointed. The Raja insisted upon appointing Md Isa instead, exercising his constitutional discretion to prevail over the wishes of Abdullah and UMNO. Shahidan left the Perlis Executive Council (a body akin to a Cabinet), sitting out the 2008–13 State Assembly term as a backbencher and criticising Md Isa's leadership.

In the 2013 general elections, Shahidan returned to federal Parliament in the seat of Arau, switching seats with his brother Ismail Kassim, who had held Arau since 2008. Shahidan defeated the senior Pan-Malaysian Islamic Party (PAS) leader Haron Din by 1,371 votes. Despite his return to federal politics, Shahidan had stated before the election that his preference would have been to remain in the State Assembly. After the election, he was appointed to the cabinet of Najib Razak as a Minister in the Prime Minister's Department. In 2018 general election, he was reelected as the Arau MP while he was removed from the Cabinet and government following victory of the Pakatan Harapan (PH) opposition coalition in the election, the government was taken over by the new coalition after more than six decades when BN remained in power. The PH government collapsed in February 2020, a new coalition, namely Perikatan Nasional (PN), took over the government in March 2020. On 9 March 2021, Minister of Housing and Local Government Zuraida Kamaruddin announced his appointments as both Chairman of Perbadanan Perumahan Rakyat 1Malaysia (PR1MA) and Chairman of the National Housing Corporation (NHC) with immediate effect. On 24 April 2021, he was removed from the position of the State Chairman of Perlis of UMNO by party President Ahmad Zahid Hamidi and being replaced by Azlan Man, who is also the Menteri Besar of Perlis.

Controversies and issues
According to Joceline Tan, columnist for The Star, Shahidan has a "larger-than-life personality" and is known for his "warlord style of politics". He has held numerous positions in sports administration, including the presidencies of the Malaysia Athletic Federation, the Amateur Swimming Union of Malaysia and the Perlis Football Association. In 2010, he called for Facebook to be banned in Malaysia, citing national security issues after a Facebook account holder was found to have insulted Islam and the current as well as the former Prime Ministers of Malaysia.

In 1992, he received international coverage for his criticism of what he cited as the criminal acts of Sultan Iskandar of Johor and his son Tunku Ibrahim Ismail.

Shahidan is a leading proponent of Salafism—a puritanical Sunni Islamic movement opposed by Malaysia's religious establishment—within UMNO. In 2010 he arranged for a group of young Salafi clerics, including Fathul Bari Mat Jahya, to join UMNO to boost the party's standing with conservative Muslim voters. While Chief Minister of Perlis, his government passed anti-apostasy laws in the State Assembly and sought to loosen restrictions on polygamy in the state.

In 2017, Shahidan declared that "atheism is against the Constitution and the basic human rights" in Malaysia since "there is no provision on atheism" in the Constitution. Shahidan wanted atheists and atheist groups like the Kuala Lumpur chapter of Atheist Republic to be identified and hunted down. He also stated that "we need to restore the faith back in them, especially for Muslims. Actually they don't really want to be an atheist, but they lack knowledge about religion and that is why they are easily swayed to the new age teaching".

On 20 October 2018, a police report was made by a teenage girl, 15, alleged that Shahidan had molested her  but the report was withdrawn by the victim's family on the same day. It was speculated that the family has taken the decision due to bribery. The victim from Arau, Perlis, wrote in her police report that she was told by her teacher that the former minister had wanted to see her after he saw her perform with a band at Stadium Tuanku Syed Putra.The secondary school student had been performing with a group, Kumpulan Aukustika on 7 @ DSSK Busker. According to her, when she went to the Shahidan's car, he invited her to play in Kuala Lumpur and offered her an RM4,000 fee. She alleged that during the discussion, he held her hand and caressed her shoulder without her consent. The student said she immediately ran out crying of the car. After full police investigation, Shahidan was charged with molesting the underage girl at the Sessions Court, Kangar on 12 November 2018. On 24 April 2019, Shahidan was given a discharge not amounting to an acquittal by the Kangar Sessions Court for the allegation of molesting of an underage girl after the victim retracted her report. In 2021, Shahidan's initial selection for the women, children and social development affairs Parliamentary Special Select Committee (SSC) had to be rescinded and replaced by another MP after his appointment was widely condemned and objected as he is claimed being 'tainted' with his child molestation case in 2019.

Election results

Honours
  :
  Knight Grand Commander of the Order of the Crown of Perlis (SPMP) – Dato’ Seri (1995)
  :
  Grand Knight of the Order of Sultan Ahmad Shah of Pahang (SSAP) – Dato’ Sri (2002)

References

External links
 
Whatsapp report number: +6019-454 5111

1951 births
Living people
People from Perlis
Malaysian people of Malay descent
Malaysian Muslims
Former United Malays National Organisation politicians
Malaysian Islamic Party politicians
Government ministers of Malaysia
Chief Ministers of Perlis
Perlis state executive councillors
Members of the 15th Malaysian Parliament
Members of the Dewan Rakyat
Members of the Perlis State Legislative Assembly
Persecution of atheists
University of Malaya alumni
21st-century Malaysian politicians